The Congregational Union of Australia was a Congregational denomination in Australia that stemmed from the Congregational Church in England as settlers migrated from there to Australia.

Congregational Churches existed in all states and territories of Australia at some time. The oldest Congregational Church was founded in Hobart in 1830 by Frederick Miller.

History
One of the earliest and most influential Congregational ministers in early times was Thomas Q. Stow, who built the first church in South Australia.

Some of the first Congregational Churches established in each Australian state included the Pitt St church in Sydney, Stow Memorial Church (now Pilgrim Uniting) in Adelaide, Collins Street (now St Michael's) church in Melbourne, Trinity (now Trinity Uniting) in Perth, and National Memorial Church (now City Uniting) in Canberra.

The Congregational Church was the first Christian denomination in Australia to ordain women, with the first female ordained being Winifred Kiek in 1927.

Dissolution
The Union dissolved in 1977 when the Uniting Church in Australia was formed. 260 of the congregations that had previously formed the Union joined the new Uniting Church. The Uniting Church union also included the Methodist Church of Australasia and the Presbyterian Church of Australia.

However, 40 other congregations that had previously formed the Union objected to joining the new Uniting Church and formed the Fellowship of Congregational Churches instead. In 1995, there was a split within that Fellowship, with some more ecumenically-minded congregations leaving to form the Congregational Federation of Australia.

Today, there are, therefore, three Christian organizations that can claim to be direct 'descendants' of the Union.

References

Further reading

Uniting Church in Australia
Former Christian denominations
Religious organizations disestablished in 1977
Religious organizations established in 1830
1830 establishments in Australia